Kanako Murata (村田 夏南子, born August 10, 1993) is a Japanese female mixed martial artist who competes in the Strawweight division of the Ultimate Fighting Championship. A professional mixed martial artist since 2016, Murata has also competed in Rizin Fighting Federation and Invicta FC where she is a former Invicta FC Strawweight Champion.

Background
Murata was born and raised in Matsuyama, Japan. The granddaughter of a judo dojo master, Murata started training judo at the age of three. She was a national champion in judo in her high school years. After judo, she transitioned to freestyle wrestling in which she won Junior World Championship in 2011.

Mixed martial arts career

Rizin Fighting Federation
Murata was scheduled to make her professional debut against Natalya Denisova at Rizin 1 on April 17, 2016. She won the fight by unanimous decision.

Murata made her flyweight debut against Maia Kahaunaele-Stevenson at KOTC: Firefight on June 4, 2016. She won the fight by a third-round technical knockout.

Murata remained at flyweight for her next fight with Ilona Wijmans at Shoot Box Girls S-Cup 2016 on July 7, 2016. She won the fight by a first-round technical knockout.

Murata was scheduled to face Kyra Batara in a strawweight bout at Rizin World Grand Prix 2016: 1st Round  on September 26, 2016. She won the fight by unanimous decision.

Murata was scheduled to face Rin Nakai in a flyweight bout at Rizin World Grand Prix 2016: 2nd Round on December 29, 2016. Murata suffered her first professional loss, tapping to a rear-naked choke in the third round.

Murata was scheduled to face Claire Fryer in a strawweight bout at Pancrase 288 on July 2, 2017. She won the fight by unanimous decision.

Murata was scheduled to face Yukari Nabe in a flyweight bout at DEEP 79 Impact on September 16, 2017. She won the fight by unanimous decision.

Murata remained at flyweight for her next fight, against Lanchana Green at Rizin 10 on May 6, 2018. She won the fight by a first-round anaconda choke submission.

Murata was scheduled to face Angela Magana at Rizin 12 on August 12, 2018. She won the fight by a first-round submission.

Murata made her last appearance with Rizin against Saray Orozco at Rizin 15 on April 21, 2019. Murata was originally scheduled to face Shinju Nozawa-Auclair, before Nozawa-Auclair withdrew due to a ligament injury. She won the fight by her second career, and second consecutive, Von Flue choke submission.

Invicta
It was announced on August 30, 2018, that Murata had signed with Invicta FC, and would compete in their strawweight division.

Murata was scheduled to make her promotional debut with Invicta, almost a year after signing with them, against Liana Pirosin at Invicta FC 35: Bennett vs. Rodriguez II on June 7, 2019. She won the fight by a first-round rear-naked choke submission. This fight earned her a "Performance of the Night" award.

Murata was scheduled to fight Emily Ducote for the vacant Invicta FC Strawweight Championship at Invicta FC 38: Murata vs. Ducote on November 1, 2019. She won the fight by split decision.

Ultimate Fighting Championship
Murata announced on July 5, 2020, that she had signed with the UFC.

Murata was expected to face Lívia Renata Souza on November 14, 2020 at UFC Fight Night: Felder vs. dos Anjos. However, Souza pulled out in early November due to an undisclosed injury and was replaced by Randa Markos. She won the fight via unanimous decision.

Murata faced Virna Jandiroba on June 19, 2021 at UFC on ESPN 25. She lost the fight via doctor stoppage after round 2 due to a elbow dislocation caused by an armbar applied by Jandiroba.

Championships and accomplishments
Invicta Fighting Championships
Invicta FC Strawweight Championship (One time, former)
Performance of the Night (One time)  vs. Liana Pirosin

Mixed martial arts record

|-
|Loss
|align=center|12–2
|Virna Jandiroba
|TKO (arm injury)
|UFC on ESPN: The Korean Zombie vs. Ige 
|
|align=center|2
|align=center|5:00
|Las Vegas, Nevada, United States
|
|-
|Win
|align=center|12–1
|Randa Markos
|Decision (unanimous)
|UFC Fight Night: Felder vs. dos Anjos
|
|align=center|3
|align=center|5:00
|Las Vegas, Nevada, United States
|
|-
| Win
| align=center|11–1
| Emily Ducote
| Decision (split)
| Invicta FC 38: Murata vs. Ducote
|  
| align=center| 5
| align=center| 5:00
| Kansas City, Kansas, United States
| 
|-
| Win
| align=center|10–1
| Liana Pirosin
| Submission (rear-naked choke)
| Invicta FC 35: Bennett vs. Rodriguez II
|  
| align=center| 1
| align=center| 2:10
| Kansas City, Kansas, United States
| 
|-
| Win
| align=center|9–1
| Saray Orozco
| Submission (Von Flue choke)
| Rizin 15 
|  
| align=center| 2
| align=center| 2:12
| Yokohama, Japan
| 
|-
| Win
| align=center|8–1
| Angela Magana
| Submission (Von Flue choke)
| Rizin 12 
|  
| align=center| 2
| align=center| 3:53
| Nagoya, Japan
| 
|-
| Win
| align=center|7–1
| Lanchana Green
| Submission (anaconda choke)
| Rizin 10 
|  
| align=center| 1
| align=center| 4:52
| Fukuoka, Japan
| 
|-
| Win
| align=center|6–1
| Yukari Nabe
| Decision (unanimous)
| DEEP 79 Impact
|  
| align=center| 3
| align=center| 5:00
| Tokyo, Japan
| 
|-
| Win
| align=center|5–1
| Claire Fryer
| Decision (unanimous)
| Pancrase 288
|  
| align=center| 3
| align=center| 5:00
| Tokyo, Japan
| 
|-
| Loss
| align=center|4–1
| Rin Nakai
| Submission (rear-naked choke)
| Rizin World Grand Prix 2016: 2nd Round 
|  
| align=center| 3
| align=center| 1:16
| Saitama, Japan
| 
|-
| Win
| align=center|4–0
| Kyra Batara
| Decision (unanimous)
| Rizin World Grand Prix 2016: 1st Round 
|  
| align=center| 3
| align=center| 5:00
| Saitama, Japan
| 
|-
| Win
| align=center|3–0
| Ilona Wijmans
| TKO (punches)
| Shoot Box Girls S-Cup 2016
|  
| align=center| 1
| align=center| 1:17
| Tokyo, Japan
| 
|-
| Win
| align=center|2–0
| Maia Kahaunaele-Stevenson
| TKO (punches)
| KOTC: Firefight
|  
| align=center| 3
| align=center| 3:43
| San Jacinto, California, United States
| 
|-
| Win
| align=center|1–0
| Natalya Denisova
| Decision (unanimous)
| Rizin 1 
|  
| align=center| 3
| align=center| 5:00
| Nagoya, Japan
| 
|-

See also
 List of current UFC fighters
 List of female mixed martial artists

References

External links
 
 

1993 births
Living people
Japanese female mixed martial artists
Strawweight mixed martial artists
Mixed martial artists utilizing judo
Mixed martial artists utilizing freestyle wrestling
Mixed martial artists utilizing Brazilian jiu-jitsu
Japanese practitioners of Brazilian jiu-jitsu
Female Brazilian jiu-jitsu practitioners
Japanese female sport wrestlers
Japanese female judoka
Universiade medalists in wrestling
People from Matsuyama, Ehime
Universiade bronze medalists for Japan
Medalists at the 2013 Summer Universiade
Asian Wrestling Championships medalists
Ultimate Fighting Championship female fighters
21st-century Japanese women